The Peruípe River (Braço Sul) is a river in Bahia state in eastern Brazil. It is one of two branches which form parts of the boundaries of Ibirapuã municipality before merging to form the Peruípe River.

See also
List of rivers of Bahia

References

Rivers of Bahia